Jewish settlement may refer to:

Events
 Jewish settlement in the land of Israel
 Israeli settlement, Jewish communities currently established in the West Bank and in the Golan Heights, between 1967 and 2006 in the Gaza Strip, and between 1967 and 1982 in the Sinai Peninsula
 Pale of Settlement, a region of the Russian Empire in which permanent residency by Jews was allowed and beyond which Jewish permanent residency was generally prohibited
 Jewish settlement in the Japanese Empire
 Aliyah, settlement of Jewish refugees and voluntary migrants in Palestine
 Jodensavanne, a Jewish settlement in Dutch Guyana

Concepts
 Settlement movement (Israel), a movement supporting a specific style of communal settlements known as kibbutzim and moshavim.